Gallo-Roman religion is a fusion of the traditional religious practices of the Gauls, who were originally Celtic speakers, and the Roman and Hellenistic religions introduced to the region under Roman Imperial rule. It was the result of selective acculturation.

Deities
In some cases, Gaulish deity names were used as epithets for Roman deities, and vice versa, as with Lenus Mars or Jupiter Poeninus. In other cases, Roman gods were given Gaulish female partners – for example, Mercury was paired with Rosmerta and Sirona was partnered with Apollo. In at least one case – that of the equine goddess Epona – a native Celtic goddess was also adopted by Romans.

The Jupiter Column was a distinctive type of religious monument from Roman Gaul and Germania, combining an equestrian Jupiter overcoming a giant (or sometimes Jupiter enthroned) with panels depicting many other deities.

Eastern mystery religions penetrated Gaul early on. These included the cults of Orpheus, Mithras, Cybele, and Isis. The imperial cult, centred primarily on the numen of Augustus, came to play a prominent role in the public religion of Gaul, most dramatically at the Sanctuary of the Three Gauls at Lugdunum.

Practices
Roman religious practices such as offerings of incense and animal sacrifice, dedicatory inscriptions, and naturalistic statuary depicting deities in anthropomorphic form were combined with specific Gaulish practices such as circumambulation around a temple. This gave rise to a characteristic Gallo-Roman fanum, identifiable in archaeology from its concentric shape.

See also
 Roman Gaul
 Gallo-Roman culture
 Interpretatio romana
 Celtic mythology

Sources
 Burnand, Y. (1999). "Notes sur le vocabulaire épigraphique de la représentation de la divinité en Gaule romaine" in Signa deorum : L'iconographie divine en Gaule romaine. Communications présentées au colloque organisé par le Centre Albert Grenier d'antiquité nationale de l'Université de Nancy II et la direction d'études d'antiquités de la Gaule romaine de la IVe section de l'École pratique des hautes études. Y. Burnand and H. Lavagne. Paris, De Boccard. 
 Debal, J. (1983) "Vienne-en-Val, divinités et sanctuaires." Bulletin de la Société Archéologique et Historique de l'Orléanais, 42 
 Deyts, S. (1998). À la rencontre des Dieux gaulois, un défi à César. Paris: Réunion des Musées Nationaux. 
 Faudet, I. (1993) Les temples de tradition celtique en Gaule Romaine. Paris, Éditions Errance.  
 Green, M. (1986) Gods of the Celts. Stroud: Sutton Publishing Limited. .
 Jufer, N.; Luginbühl, T. (2001) Répertoire des dieux gaulois. Paris, Éditions Errance.  
 Weisgerber, G. (1975). Das Pilgerheiligtum des Apollo und der Sirona von Hochscheid im Hunsruck. Bonn: Rudolf Habelt Press. 
 Woolf, G. (1998). Becoming Roman: the origins of provincial civilization in Gaul. Cambridge:  Cambridge University Press.